HMS Flora was an  of the Royal Navy launched on 21 November 1893. She was constructed under the Naval Defence Act 1889 along with several other Astraea-class cruisers. Flora was decommissioned in 1922.

Operational history
HMS Flora served a commission, under the command of Commodore Robert Leonard Groome and later of Captain Frederick Sidney Pelham, as senior officer′s ship on the South East Coast of America Station until June 1901, when she returned to Devonport to pay off.

She was commissioned at Devonport on 11 November 1902 to relieve  for service on the Pacific Station. Leaving Plymouth in late November, she stopped in Funchal, Saint Vincent, Pernambuco and Montevideo before she arrived at the station early the following year.

HMS Flora was the subject of a famous salvage operation after running aground in 1903.

In 1914, just prior to the First World War, Flora was placed on the sale list and remained on harbour service for the majority of the conflict. In April 1915 Flora was renamed TS Indus II.  She was sold on 12 December 1922 and was broken up at Dover.

References

Publications

External links
 

 

Astraea-class cruisers
Ships built in Pembroke Dock
1893 ships